Alberto Sols García (1917–1989) was a researcher specializing in biochemistry, working especially on hexokinases. He effectively created  biochemistry as a major discipline in Spain.

Life 

Alberto Sols was born in Sax, Alicante, on 2 February 1917, the son of Pedro Sols Lluch. He  died in Denia, Alicante, on 10 August 1989. The house of his birth is now the Centro de Estudios y Archivo Histórico Municipal Alberto Sols.

Career 

Sols studied medicine at the University of Valencia, and after working for three years, principally with Robert Crane at Washington University in St. Louis, in the group of Nobel prizewinners Carl and Gerty Cori he returned to Spain in 1954, and  created a research group at the Spanish National Research Council (CSIC). His work concerned hexokinases and sugar phosphorylation in general.

In 1963 he was Founding President of the Spanish Society of Biochemistry (now Spanish Society of Biochemistry and Molecular Biology—Sociedad Española de Bioquímica y Biología Molecular: SEBBM). He was also a member of scientific societies in the UK, USA, Argentina and Chile.

Distinctions 

Sols received numerous prizes, and was the first holder of the premio Príncipe de Asturias de Investigación Científica y Técnica (1981). In 1987 he received the National Research Prize "Santiago Ramón y Cajal" of the Ministry of Education. In 1989 he was elected to the Royal National Academy of Medicine.

References 

Spanish biochemists
1989 deaths
Complutense University of Madrid alumni
Academic staff of the Autonomous University of Madrid
People from Alicante
Washington University in St. Louis alumni

1917 births